Mohammed Yousuf Mohamed (born Sep 9, 1982) is a Qatari professional basketball player.  He currently plays for Al Jaysh Army SC Doha of the Qatari Basketball League.

He represented Qatar's national basketball team at the 2015 FIBA Asia Championship in Changsha, China. There, he was his team's best rebounder.

References

External links
 Asia-basket.com Profile
 2016 FIBA Asia Challenge Profile
 2015 FIBA Asia Championship Profile

1982 births
Living people
Centers (basketball)
People from Doha
Qatari men's basketball players
Basketball players at the 2014 Asian Games
Basketball players at the 2018 Asian Games
Asian Games competitors for Qatar